Mayor is a 2020 documentary film produced and directed by David Osit. The film follows Musa Hadid, the mayor of Ramallah,  the de facto capital of Palestine, for two years.

Release 
Mayor premiered in March 2020 at the True/False Film Fest, one of the last film festivals to proceed as scheduled in the first half of 2020 due to the Coronavirus pandemic. The film was acquired by Film Movement for theatrical distribution in North America, beginning at Film Forum on December 2, and was released online on the Criterion Channel and video on demand platforms in early 2021. The film was subsequently a recipient of a 2022 Peabody Award.

Reception 
On review aggregator Rotten Tomatoes, the film holds an approval rating of  based on  reviews. The site's critical consensus reads, "A clear-eyed look at an extraordinary subject, Mayor makes essential viewing out of one politician's quest to preserve dignity in the midst of bureaucracy." In his Critic's Pick review for Indiewire Eric Kohn writes "There have been countless documentaries made about the West Bank experience, from “5 Broken Cameras” to “The Settlers,” and they often involve the travails of ordinary life existing side by side with military persecution. “Mayor” offers a striking new perspective on that struggle, with a personal on-the-ground quality matched by grand tonal ambitions that makes it the best of its subgenre."

Tomris Laffley of Variety writes "Osit brings a respectful approach that admirably never registers as observations of a patronizing Westerner", and called the film "astonishing" and "sharply witty".

Many reviews praised the film's use of dark comedy; in his Critic's Pick review for The New York Times Ben Kenigsberg calls the film "surprisingly funny", Stephen Saito of Movable Fest writes that the film often resembles "a lost season of Veep" and Mary McNamara of Los Angeles Times describes the film as both "troubling and hilarious". Alissa Wilkinson of Vox wrote "At times, it plays like Veep — if the characters in Veep were actually kind, compassionate, and oriented toward what best serves the public’s interest. But Mayor also shows how challenging the job of mayor is, even for a talented leader like Hadid, who struggles to show the world what the citizens of his city are facing as they, and he, go about their lives under impossible and seemingly intractable circumstances."

Awards

Lists

References

External links 

2020 films
American documentary films
2020 documentary films
Documentary films about the Israeli–Palestinian conflict
2020s English-language films
2020s Arabic-language films
Israeli–Palestinian conflict films
2020 multilingual films
American multilingual films
2020s American films